Fort Snelling is a former military fortification and National Historic Landmark in the U.S. state of Minnesota on the bluffs overlooking the confluence of the Minnesota and Mississippi Rivers. The military site was initially named Fort Saint Anthony, but it was renamed Fort Snelling once its construction was completed in 1825.

Before the American Civil War, the U.S. Army supported slavery at the fort by allowing its soldiers to bring their personal enslaved people. These included African Americans Dred Scott and Harriet Robinson Scott, who lived at the fort in the 1830s. In the 1840s, the Scotts sued for their freedom, arguing that having lived in "free territory" made them free, leading to the landmark United States Supreme Court case Dred Scott v. Sandford. Slavery ended at the fort just before Minnesota statehood in 1858.

The fort served as the primary center for U.S. government forces during the Dakota War of 1862. It also was the site of the encampment where eastern Dakota and Ho-chunk non-combatants awaited riverboat transport in their forced removal from Minnesota when hostilities ceased. The fort served as a recruiting station during the Civil War, Spanish–American War, and both World Wars before being decommissioned a second time in 1946. It then fell into a state of disrepair until the lower post was restored to its original appearance in 1965. At that time, all that remained of the original lower post were the round and hexagonal towers. Many of the important buildings of the upper post remain today with some still in disrepair.

The historic fort is in the unorganized territory of Fort Snelling within Hennepin County, bordering Ramsey and Dakota counties.

There are now multiple government agencies that own portions of the former fort with the Minnesota Historical Society administering the Historic Fort Snelling site. The Minnesota Department of Natural Resources administers Fort Snelling State Park at the bottom of the bluff. Fort Snelling once encompassed the park's land. It has been cited as a "National Treasure" by the National Trust for Historic Preservation. The historic fort is in the Mississippi National River and Recreation Area, a National Park Service unit.

History

Bdóte
Bdóte ('meeting of waters' or 'where two rivers meet') is considered a place of spiritual importance to the Dakota. A Dakota-English Dictionary (1852) edited by missionary Stephen Return Riggs originally recorded the word as mdóte, noting that it was also "a name commonly applied to the country about Fort Snelling, or mouth of the Saint Peters," now known as the Minnesota River. According to Riggs, "The Mdewakantonwan think that the mouth of the Minnesota River is precisely over the center of the earth and that they occupy the gate that opens into the western world."

The confluence of the Minnesota and Mississippi Rivers also became a place where Native Americans would sign treaties with the United States: the 1805 Treaty of St. Peters signed by the Mdewakanton Dakota, the 1837 White Pine Treaty signed by several Ojibwe bands, and the 1851 Treaty of Mendota signed by representatives of the Mdewakanton and Wahpekute Dakota.

Land cession treaty

In 1805, Lieutenant Zebulon Pike signed a treaty he was unauthorized to create, known as Pike's Purchase (1805 Treaty of St. Peters). There were seven Dakota members present, with only two signing the treaty: Cetan Wakuwa Mani (Petit Corbeau) and Way Aga Enogee (Waynyaga Inaźin). It ceded 155,320 acres of land in the area. For an unspecified amount of money, later valued at $2,000. (400 km2)  The treaty states:Article One — That the Sioux nation grants unto the United States for the purpose of establishment of military posts, nine miles square at the mouth of river St. Croix, also from below the confluence of the Mississippi and St. Peters, up the Mississippi to Include the falls of St. Anthony, extending nine miles on each side of the river.Legal scholars, historians, and the Dakota have long raised questions about the validity of the 1805 treaty. Although Pike was an army officer, he was not authorized to sign a treaty on behalf of the United States, nor were there any formal witnesses. Pike represented the treaty as having been agreed with the entire Sioux nation, but in reality it was only signed by representatives of two Mdewakanton villages.

From a legal point of view, there was insufficient description of the land the signers intended to convey. Furthermore, there was no consideration, or payment terms, stated in the treaty. Pike wrote in his journal he thought the land was worth US$200,000, but within the treaty itself he left the payment amount blank, deferring to Congress to determine the final amount to be paid. On April 16, 1808, when the U.S. Senate finally ratified the treaty, it approved payment to the Dakota in the amount of only $2,000. Payment for the ceded lands only arrived in 1819, when the United States Department of War sent Major Thomas Forsyth to distribute approximately $2,000 worth of goods. In 1838, Indian agent Lawrence Taliaferro paid a further $4,000 to try to settle the matter with other Dakota bands, but the issue would continue to be raised in subsequent treaty negotiations in the 1850s.

Pike Island, at the mouth of the Minnesota River, was later named after Zebulon Pike.

Frontier post 
Following the War of 1812, the United States Department of War built a chain of forts and installed Indian agents from Lake Michigan to the Missouri River in South Dakota. These forts were intended to extend the United States presence into the northwest territories following the Treaty of Ghent and the demarcation of the 49th parallel. The treaty restricted British-Canadian traders from operating in the US and the forts were intended to enforce that as well as keep Indian lands free of white settlement until permitted by treaty. The forts were seen as the embodiment of federal authority representing law, order, for the protection of pioneers and traders. The Fort Snelling garrison also attempted to keep the peace among the Dakota and other tribes . Also built on army land was the St. Peter's Indian Agency at Mendota. The Anglo-Europeans called the Minnesota River the St. Peter's and the Indian Agency would be a part of Fort Snelling from 1820 to 1853.Lieutenant Colonel Henry Leavenworth commanded the expedition of 5th Infantry that built the initial outpost in 1819. That cantonment was called "New Hope" and was on the river flats along the Minnesota River. Col. Leavenworth lost 40 men to scurvy that winter and moved his encampment to Camp Coldwater because he felt the riverside location contributed to the outbreak. The new camp was near a spring closer to the fortification he was constructing. That spring would be the source of drinking water to the fort throughout the 19th century. The spring held a spiritual significance to the Sioux. The post surgeon began recording meteorological observations at the fort in January 1820. The U.S. Army Surgeon General had made the recording of four weather readings every day a duty of the surgeon at every Army post. Fort Snelling has one of the longest near-continuous weather records in the country. In 1820 Colonel Josiah Snelling took command of the outpost and the fort's construction. Upon completion in 1824, he christened his work "Fort St. Anthony" for the waterfalls just upriver. That did not last long as it was changed by General Winfield Scott to Fort Snelling in recognition of the fort's architect commander.

From construction in 1820 to closure in 1858, four army units would garrison the fort, the 1st, 5th, 6th, 10th Regiments. plus a company from the 1st Dragoons. In 1827 the 5th Infantry would be replaced by the 1st Infantry for ten years with the 5th returning in 1837. The 5th would garrison the fort until the 1st relieved them again in 1840. In 1848 the 6th Infantry became the garrison. The garrison would change again in November 1855. The 10th commanded by Col. C.F. Smith assumed duty. Smith would go on to become a major general.

Colonel Snelling was recalled to Washington leaving Fort Snelling in September 1827. He died the next summer from complications of dysentery and a "brain fever".

In 1827 the first post office in Minnesota started at Fort Snelling with most mail forwarded from Prairie du Chien.

Colonel Zachary Taylor assumed command in 1828. He observed that the "buffalo are entirely gone and bear and deer are scarcely seen." He also wrote that the "Indians subsist principally on fish, water fowl and wild rice". While posted to Fort Snelling Col. Taylor had eight adult slaves die as well as several minors. Along with the construction of the fort an Indian Agency was constructed on the military Reservation opposite the fort at Mendota. It was administered by Major Lawrence Taliaferro. In 1834 Taliaferro and the fort commandant, Major Bliss, assisted missionaries Gideon and Samuel W. Pond develop the Dakota alphabet and compile a Dakota dictionary. Taliaferro also served as the Territorial Justice of Peace until 1838 when the Governor of Iowa named Henry Sibley his replacement. The Agency was used to hold court and those incarcerated were sent to Fort Snelling's round tower. The town of St. Paul also sent its criminals to the tower until it built its first jail in 1851. Both Fort Snelling and Fort Ripley provided this civil service for internment of criminals until the territory developed the civil infrastructure needed. Major Taliaferro owned 21 slaves one of whom was Harriet Robinson. She married Dred Scott with Major Taliaferro officiating at Mendota.

John Marsh, arrived at the fort during the early-1820s. He started the first school in the Territory for the officers' children. Marsh developed a relationship with the Dakota compiling a dictionary of the dialect used by the Mendota tribe. He had studied medicine at Harvard without earning a degree. He continued his studies under the tutelage of the fort's physician, Dr. Purcell. However, Purcell died before he completed the coursework and March moved west. Major Plympton became post commander in August 1837. He made determining the actual boundaries of the fort's land a priority, doing two surveys. 
After the second he sent troops to evict Pigs-eye Parrant from Fountain Cave down river. Pigseye's tavern there was the first commercial venture in what became St. Paul. Parrant gained notoriety for his bootleg liquor business with both the Dakota and the soldiers causing issues for the fort commander. The eviction coincided with the arrival of the Catholic missionary Lucian Galtier. That year also brought the arrival of Pierre Bottineau, the Kit Carson of the Northwest. He would serve the fort as a guide and interpreter. He could speak French and English, Dakota, Ojibwe, Cree, Mandan and Hochunk.Lieutenant Colonel Seth Eastman was commander of the fort twice in the 1840s. Eastman was an artist. He has been recognized for his extensive work recording the Dakota. His skill was such that he was commissioned by Congress to illustrate the six-volume study of Indian Tribes of the United States by Henry Rowe Schoolcraft. The set was published 1851–1857 with hundreds of his works.

From 1833 to 1836 Dr. Nathan Sturges Jarvis (surgeon) was stationed at Fort Snelling. During that time he acquired a notable collection of northern plains Native American artifacts now housed at the Brooklyn Museum.

In 1848 A Co of the 6th U.S. Infantry was dispatched from Fort Snelling to build Fort Ripley.
 In 1848 the Fort's Military Reservation was declared too big, with the lands east of the Mississippi detached and sold. That land created much of what became St. Paul. 
 In the summer of 1849, D Company 1st Dragoons escorted Maj. Woods of the 6th Infantry at Fort Snelling, to mark a northern boundary line and select a site for a future fortification near Pembina.
 In 1850 E Co of the 6th Infantry was sent south to build Fort Dodge and would garrison the fort until the army closed it and sent E Co. to help construct Fort Ridgely.
 In 1850 Alexander Ramsey requested Congress fund five military roads in the Territory. Two ran from Mendota at Fort Snelling. One followed the Mississippi to Wabasha and the Iowa border. The other headed west to the Big Sioux River confluence with the Missouri.
 In 1853 C, E, and K Companies of the 6th Infantry were tasked with the construction of Fort Ridgely.
Also in 1853, congress authorized money specifically to "mount" E Company of the 3rd Artillery to be stationed at Fort Snelling and Fort Ridgely until May 1861.
1856 Major Edward Canby was fort commander. He became a general. The only one killed in the Indian wars. The town of Canby is named for him.
1857-1861 G,I, and L Companies 2nd Artillery were variously posted to northern forts Snelling, Ridgely, Ripley.
1864-65 The Minnesota Valley Railroad completed line from St. Paul to Minneapolis crossing the river at Mendota that passed beneath the Fort. Pilings remain of the line's river crossing.

As the towns of Minneapolis and St. Paul grew and with Minnesota statehood before Congress, the need for a forward frontier military post had ceased. In 1857, with the fort's deactivation looming, the garrison was sent to Fort Leavenworth, Kansas, to join the other units being sent to Utah for what became known as the Utah War. With the departure of the 10th Infantry, Fort Snelling was designated surplus government property. In 1858, when Minnesota became a state, the army sold it to Franklin Steele for $90,000. Steele operated the two ferries serving the fort across both rivers at the same time he was the sutler to the fort. He also was a friend of the sitting President, James Buchanan. A small portion of that land was later annexed into south Minneapolis. The balance of that original land is now broken into: Historic Fort Snelling Interpretive Center (300 acres), Fort Snelling State Park (2,931 acres), Fort Snelling National Cemetery (436 acres), Fort Snelling VA Hospital (160 acres), Minnesota Veterans Home (53 acres), Coldwater Spring National Park (29 acres), the Upper Post Veterans Home, Minneapolis St Paul International Airport and the Minneapolis-St Paul Joint Air Reserve Station (2,930 acres).

Fort Snelling watercolor by Lt. Sully October 1855.

Slavery at the fort
When Fort Snelling was built in 1820, fur traders and officers at the post, including Colonel Snelling, employed slave labor for cooking, cleaning, and other domestic chores. Although slavery was a violation of both the Northwest Ordinance of 1787 and the Missouri Compromise of 1820, an estimated 15–30 Africans worked as slaves at the fort. US Army officers submitted pay vouchers to cover the expenses of retaining slaves. From 1855 to 1857, nine individuals were enslaved at Fort Snelling. The last slave-holding unit was the 10th Infantry. Slavery was made unconstitutional in Minnesota when the state constitution was ratified in 1858.

Two women that had lived as slaves at Fort Snelling sued for their freedom and were set free in 1836. One, named Rachel, was a slave to a Lieutenant Thomas Stockton at Fort Snelling from 1830 to 1831, then at Fort Crawford at Prairie du Chien until 1834. When Rachel and her son were sold in St. Louis, she sued, claiming that she had been illegally enslaved in the Minnesota Territory. In 1836 the Missouri Supreme Court ruled in her favor making her a free person. The second woman, Courtney, also sued for freedom in St. Louis. When the Missouri Supreme Court ruled in Rachel's favor, Courtney's slaveowner conceded her case as well, and freed Courtney and her son William. Courtney had another son named Godfrey that remained in Minnesota when she was sent to a slave market in St. Louis. He is the only known "Minnesota runaway slave" that ran away from the fort and was taken in by the Dakota. He was involved in the Dakota War and was the first defendant on the docket of the military tribunal for hanging.

The fort surgeon, Dr. John Emerson, purchased Dred Scott at a slave market in Saint Louis, Missouri, where slavery was legal. Emerson was posted to Fort Snelling during the 1830s and brought Dred north with him. There Dred meet and married Harriet and had two children as slaves at Fort Snelling from 1836 to 1840. Dr. Emerson's wife Irene, returned to St. Louis taking the Scotts and their children in 1840. In 1843 Dred sued for his family's freedom for illegally being indentured in free territory. Although he lost that first trial, he appealed and in 1850 his family was given their freedom. In 1852, Emerson appealed and the Scotts were again enslaved. Dred Scott appealed that decision and in 1857 the US Supreme Court decided that the Scotts would stay enslaved. Dred Scott v. Sandford was a landmark case that held that neither enslaved nor free Africans were meant to hold the privileges or constitutional rights of United States citizens. This case garnered national attention and pushed political tensions towards the Civil War.

A longstanding precedent in freedom suits of "once free, always free" was overturned in this case. (The cases were combined under Dred Scott's name.) It was appealed to the United States Supreme Court. In Dred Scott v. Sandford (1857), Chief Justice Taney ruled that the Missouri Compromise was unconstitutional and that enslaved Africans had no standing under the constitution, so could not sue for freedom. The decision increased sectional tensions between the North and South.

Civil War

When the American Civil War broke out the Government commandeered the fort for the War Department as an induction station. At the time Steele was in arrears, having made only one payment. When Governor Ramsey offered President Lincoln 1000 troops to fight the South the volunteers he got were organized at Fort Snelling into a regiment, the 1st Minnesota. More than 24,000 recruits were trained there.

Minnesota units mustered in at Fort Snelling:
 1st Minnesota April 1861 (lineage today: 2nd Battalion 135th Infantry)
 2nd Minnesota June–July 1861 (lineage today: 136th Infantry Regiment)
 3rd Minnesota Oct–Nov 1861
 4th Minnesota Oct–Nov 1861
 5th Minnesota Mar–Apr 1862
 6th Minnesota Sep–Nov 1862
 7th Minnesota Aug–Oct 1862
 8th Minnesota Jun–Sep 1862
 9th Minnesota Aug–Oct 1862
 10th Minnesota Aug–Nov 1862
 11th Minnesota Aug–Sep 1864
 1st Minnesota Infantry Battalion Aug–Sep 1864
 1st Minnesota Sharpshooters Company Apr 1864
 2nd Minnesota Sharpshooters Company Jan 1862
 1st Minnesota Heavy Artillery Nov 1864 (today 151st Field Artillery)
 1st Minnesota Light Artillery Battery Nov 1861
 2nd Minnesota Light Artillery Battery Mar 1862
 3rd Minnesota Light Artillery Battery Feb 1863
 1st Minnesota Cavalry Oct–Dec 1862
 2nd Minnesota Cavalry Regiment Dec 1863
 1st Minnesota Light Cavalry(Bracket's Battalion) Sep–Nov 1861
 Minnesota Independent Cavalry Battalion (Hatch's Battalion) Jul 1863
 During the civil war, slightly over 100 African Americans approached Fort Snelling to volunteer for military service. Minnesota did not have an African American population large enough to field a "colored" unit as US Infantry units were segregated. Those volunteers were put on riverboats to Iowa and Missouri, states that had "colored" units: 1st Iowa Infantry Colored, 18th United States Colored Infantry Regiment, and the 68th United States Colored Infantry. The navy had a few volunteers also.
In 1830 Fort Snelling was the birthplace of John Taylor Wood. He served on the Merrimack at the Battle of Hampton Roads during the civil war.

In 1860 and 1863 the Minnesota State Fair was held at the fort.

In 1865 the Minnesota Central Railroad completed rail line from Northfield to Mendota. There the line crossed the river to Fort Snelling, continuing on to Minneapolis.
In June 1865 the 10th US Infantry Hq, D, and F Companies returned to the 10th's pre-war post at Fort Snelling. B and H Companies went to Fort Ridgely while A and I Companies went to Fort Ripley.

With the war over Steele submitted a claim of $162,000 for the forts use during the war. He hoped to gain the money's he still owed from the 1857 purchase. In 1873 an agreement was reached giving the Army the fort. In exchange, his debt was cleared and Steele was given title to 6,395 acres of the original Fort Snelling Reservation.

Dakota War

On 19 August 1862, after hearing of attacks at the Lower Sioux Agency the day before, Governor Alexander Ramsey immediately went from St. Paul to Fort Snelling to assess military preparedness. Ramsey immediately ordered troops training at or near the fort to be detained from being sent east to fight in the American Civil War. On the same day, he asked his long-time friend and political rival, former Governor Henry Hastings Sibley, to lead an expedition up the Minnesota River to end the siege at Fort Ridgely. Ramsey gave him a commission as colonel and turned over four companies of the newly organized 6th Minnesota Volunteer Infantry Regiment to Sibley at Fort Snelling.

The fort became the rendezvous point for the state and federal military forces during the Dakota War of 1862. During the war, the 6th, 7th, and 10th Minnesota Regiments did garrison duty at Fort Snelling.

To deal with the uprising, the United States Department of War created the Department of the Northwest, headquartered at St. Paul and commanded by Major General John Pope. Gen. Pope arrived in St. Paul on 15 September, and sent requests to the governors of Iowa and Wisconsin for additional troops. The 25th Wisconsin Infantry Regiment arrived at Fort Snelling on 22 September, the day before the decisive Battle of Wood Lake, and were sent immediately to Mankato and Paynesville. The 27th Iowa Infantry Regiment arrived at Fort Snelling in October, well after the war was over. Four companies stayed at Fort Snelling, while the other six marched north to Mille Lacs and returned to Fort Snelling on 4 November; three days later they were sent to Cairo, Illinois.In November 1862, 1,658 Dakota, all innocent non-combatants, were moved from the Lower Sioux Agency to Fort Snelling, escorted by 300 soldiers under Lieutenant Colonel William Rainey Marshall. They were mostly Dakota women and children, but also included 22 Franco-Dakota and Anglo-Dakota men who had not been tried, as well as Christian and farmer Dakota such as Taopi, Chief Wabasha, Joseph Kawanke, Paul Mazakutemani, Lorenzo Lawrence, John Other Day and Snana who had opposed Chief Little Crow III and the "hostile" faction during the war.

An encampment was created below the fort on Pike Island. The Dakota had brought their own tipis and household goods with them, and set up more than 200 tipis. The military leaders had a palisade erected around the encampment to protect the Dakota from angry settlers, some of whom had attacked the women and children as they passed through Henderson en route to Fort Snelling. Shortly after they arrived, soldiers raped one of the Dakota women. The Dakota wintered there in 1862–63. An estimated 102 to 300 Dakota died due to the harsh conditions, lack of food, measles and cholera.

In May 1863, the Dakota who survived were loaded on two steamboats and taken down the Mississippi and up the Missouri River to Crow Creek by the Great Sioux Reservation. Three hundred more died on the way and three to four a day for weeks after they arrived. Some of the Dakota who made it to Crow Creek were forced to move again three years later to the Santee Sioux Reservation in Nebraska. For the women it was an extended period of hardship and degradation. The descendants of the displaced Dakota reside there today. A memorial is outside the Fort Snelling State Park visitor center commemorating all the Native Americans who died during this period.

Because of the prevailing attitudes towards all "Indians" the Ho-Chunk (Winnebago) that were living outside Mankato were also sent to Fort Snelling. There, they too were put on riverboats for Crow Creek. They lost 500 along the way and once there, they and the Dakota would lose another 1,300 to starvation. 

In October 1863 Major E.A.C. Hatch and his Battalion were ordered from Fort Snelling to retrieve Dakota leaders who had crossed into Canada. Winter set in before they reached Pembina in Dakota Territory. Hatch made an encampment at Pembina, sending 20 men across the border. They encountered and killed Minnesota Dakota at St. Joseph in the Northwest Territory. At Fort Gerry two Dakota leaders were drugged, kidnapped and taken to Major Hatch for a bounty. The killings at St. Joseph caused almost 400 Dakota to turn themselves in to Hatch as well.

When conditions allowed, his Cavalry took the prisoners back to Fort Snelling. The two chiefs were hanged at the fort. They were Little Six (Sakpedan) and Medicine Bottle (Wakanozanzan). Chief Little Leaf managed to evade capture.

The next year four companies of the 30th Wisconsin Infantry Regiment arrived at Fort Snelling with three of them moving forward to Camp Ridgely en route to Sulley's Dakota campaign.

Indian Wars and Spanish–American War
Steele had made plans and plotted his purchase to build the City of Fort Snelling. Steele, however, failed to make payments as agreed causing the government to revoke the sale and repossess the fort lands. Placing the Department of the Northwest at Fort Snelling led to the fort's further development in 1866 when the department transitioned to the Department of Dakota. The next year the headquarters of the department moved to St. Paul. The HQ returned to the fort in 1879 and would remain until 1886 when it went back to St. Paul. After the Civil war Minneapolis began to expand into the fort's surroundings.

In March 1869 the 20th Regiment was transferred from Louisiana to the Department of Dakota. Headquarters, band and E Company were posted to Fort Snelling.

The United States Army assigned the 7th Infantry to garrison the fort in 1878 and six companies arrived in September. That year Congress approved $100,000 to be spent on the Department of Dakota and the old fort's walls were torn down for reuse in the new construction. The following October the remaining four companies of the 7th Infantry arrived and took over garrison duties. The six companies that had been the garrison departed to fight the Utes at White River, Colorado. They returned to Fort Snelling in 1880. In November 1882 the 7th was relieved by the 25th Infantry (colored). The 25th's HQ, band and four companies would garrison the fort until 1888 when they were relieved by the 3rd Infantry. During the 1880s, companies of the 7th Cavalry would be at the fort. The 3rd Regiment would remain until 1898. Some of the garrison were sent to Cuba and fought in the Spanish–American War of 1898. During one of the last battles of the Indian Wars, six soldiers of the 3rd Infantry were killed at the Battle of Leech Lake October 5, 1898. Those killed were Major Wilkinson, Sgt. William Butler, and Privates Edward Lowe, John Olmstead (Onstead), John Schwolenstocker (aka Daniel F. Schwalenstocker), and Albert Ziebel. Those men were buried at north end of the post. Ten others were wounded in the battle. Among them were five Minnesotans: Privates George Wicker, Charles Turner, Edward Brown, Jes Jensen, and Gottfried Ziegler. Pvt. Oscar Burkard would receive the last Medal of Honor awarded during the Indian wars for his action on 5 October 1898 at Leech Lake with the 3rd Infantry. He was also from Minnesota.

In 1895 General E. C. Mason, post commandant, called for the preservation of what remained of the old fort, having realized something had been lost with the dismantling of the walls. Nothing came of the preservation proposal, but from 1901 through 1905 Congress would spend $2,000,000 on the Fort Snelling upper post.

In 1901 the 14th Infantry became the garrison followed by the 28th in 1904. From 1905 to 1911 squadrons of the 3rd, 2nd, and 4th Cavalry Regiments were the occupants of the new cavalry barracks on the upper post.

In June 1916 President Wilson had General Pershing in Mexico on the trail of Poncho Villa. To provide border security Minnesota's entire National Guard was activated at Fort Snelling, comprising three Infantry Regiments and one Artillery. A camp was created on the upper post named Camp Bobleter for organizing the activation. Upon returning to Minnesota the 1st Infantry Regiment was re-designated the 135th Infantry. It is the direct descendant of the 1st Minnesota formed at the fort in 1862.

Sgt. Charles H. Welch was awarded the Medal of Honor for his actions at Little Big Horn in 1876. His award lists his home as Fort Snelling. Welch enlisted in the Army on June 8, 1873, at Fort Snelling, and was assigned to D Company 7th U.S. Cavalry.

World War I

Once the United States entered the war the fort became a recruit processing station. For WWI the 41st Infantry was constituted at the fort in May 1917 and inactivated in September 1921. The army established an officer training school which closed when the war ended. At that time the only building seeing use was the base hospital. It was expanded to 1200 beds and designated General Hospital 29. During the 1918 influenza pandemic it saw extensive use. That hospital would be the forerunner of the VA Hospital at Fort Snelling now. Between wars, the 14th Field Artillery and the 7th Tank Battalion were assigned to Fort Snelling while the base was considered the "Country Club of the U. S. Army".

In 1921 the 3rd Infantry was in Ohio and ordered to report to Fort Snelling with no designated transport. They marched the 940 miles only to have the 2nd and 3rd Battalions inactivated upon arriving at Fort Snelling. The following June the 1st Battalion was inactivated only for a short time. The regiment would remain at Fort Snelling until 1941. Also in 1921 the US Army created the 88th Divisional area in Iowa, Minnesota and North Dakota. Fort Snelling became a Citizens Military Training Camp (CMTC) for the 351st Infantry Regiment of the 88th Division. The Officers of the unit worked with the CCC program at Fort Snelling. When Pearl Harbor happened the regiment's officers were immediately activated for active duty units so that when the 351st was called up it had very few officers to meet the call.

Civilian Conservation Corps

In 1933 the Civilian Conservation Corps was created by Executive Order 6101. Fort Snelling was located in Seventh Corps Area of the US Army and the Works Progress Administration(WPA) established a supply depot at Fort Snelling to support CCC camps. A CCC Headquarters Company was stationed at the Fort. Minnesota had two CCC companies that were entirely African American. One of these worked next the Fort in Fort Snelling State Park.

World War II

During WWII the Fort Snelling military reservation served both the army and navy. The army had an enlistment center there that processed 300,000 enlistees. The War Department chose the base to be the site of the army's Military Railroad Service(MRS) HQ in 1942 and a winter warfare program later. The MRS was closely linked to commercial railroading with multiple Minnesota railroads sponsoring MRS Railroad Operating Battalions. That year the Army created two Railroad Divisions with the Great Northern Railroad sponsoring the 704th.  The 1st MRS Division was activated at Fort Snelling (as the 701st) from where it deployed to the Mediterranean(Italy, Southern France, and North Africa). It was commanded by Brig. Gen. Carl R. Gray Jr. of the Chicago, St. Paul, Minneapolis and Omaha Railway. Gen. Gray was responsible for creating a Commendation for Meritorious Service(MRS Certificate of Merit) specific to railroading troops. In January 1943 the 701st Railway Grand Division, sponsored by the New York Central Railroad, was stood up at Fort Snelling. Minnesota Railroads sponsored multiple Railroad Operating Battalions(ROB)s with the Great Northern sponsoring the 732nd ROB.  Even though sponsored by the Great Northern, the 732nd trained at Fort Sam Houston. It landed in France and was one of two spearhead ROBs. The 732nd operated in support of Gen. Patton's 3rd Armored Division and went into Germany with them.  During the Battle of the Bulge Patton's armor would come to the 732nds trains to refuel.  The Army positioned field Artillery directly adjacent to the rail lines so that the 732nd delivered ammo directly to the guns. The 757th Railroad Shop Battalion, sponsored by the Chicago, Milwaukee, St. Paul and Pacific Railroad, set up operations at Cherbourg. The Chicago, St. Paul, Minneapolis and Omaha Railway sponsored the 714th ROB in the Territory of Alaska.

In 1944 the Military Intelligence Service Language School (MISLS) for Japanese language had outgrown its facilities at Camp Savage and it relocated to Fort Snelling. With the move the curriculum was expanded with Chinese. 
It had 125 classrooms, 160 instructors, and 3000 students. June 1946 would see the fort's 21st and last commencement at the school. The War Department constructed scores of buildings at the fort for housing and teaching during the war. The language school was relocated to Monterey, California, in June 1946.

In 1943 the navy opened an air station on the north side of Wold-Chamberlain Field that existed until 1970. That area is now used by reserve units and the Minnesota Air National Guard. WWII Fort Snelling facilities covered 1,521 acres at war's end.

Post-war 20th century 
The War Department decommissioned Fort Snelling a second time on 14 October 1946. Various federal agencies were allowed to request land parcels from the land that made up Fort Snelling Unorganized Territory. Since the army departed, the majority of the structures fell into disrepair. In 1960, the fort itself was listed as a National Historic Landmark, citing its importance as the first major military post in the region, and its later history in the development of the United States Army.

Many acres of fort land have been lost to roads. Construction of the Mendota Bridge ran a state highway across old fort land. More fort land was lost when an Interstate 494 interchange was added as well as access roads to the International Airport, National Cemetery, VA Hospital and bridge into St. Paul.

In 1963 Fort Snelling became headquarters of United States Army Reserve 205th Infantry Brigade, that had units throughout the upper Midwest. In 1994 that ended as a part of force-structure eliminations.

The fort has been reconstructed to replicate its original appearance starting in 1965. Time and use had been hard on the original fort. The walls, barracks and buildings had been removed. There was archaeological work done at the site in 1957–1958 and again in 1966–1967. At that time all that remained of the original fort were the round and hexagonal towers. State archaeologists located the foundations of all that had been demolished allowing them to pin point the structures they reconstructed. The Minnesota Historical Society has since made the original walled fort or "Lower Post" into an interactive interpretive center. It has been staffed from spring to early fall with personnel attired in period costumes. Although restoring the original fort assured its survival, many of the buildings constructed later, composing the "Upper Post", suffered serious disrepair and neglect. Many of them have been demolished.

21st century 
In May 2006, the National Trust for Historic Preservation added Upper Post of Fort Snelling to its list of "America's Most Endangered Places". Some restoration on historic Fort Snelling continues. Crews removed the flagpole from the iconic round tower and installed it in the ground, a change since its opening as a historic fort.

Legacy

USS Fort Snelling (LSD-30)

USS Fort Snelling (LSD-30) was a Thomaston-class dock landing ship of the United States Navy. She was named for Fort Snelling at the confluence of the Minnesota and Mississippi Rivers, for many years the northernmost military post in the land of the Dakota and Ojibwe. She was the second ship assigned that name, but the construction of Fort Snelling (LSD-23) was canceled on 17 August 1945.

Fort Snelling (LSD-30) was laid down on 17 August 1953 by Ingalls Shipbuilding Corp., Pascagoula, Miss.; launched on 16 July 1954, sponsored by Mrs. Robert P. Briscoe, wife of Vice Admiral Briscoe; and commissioned on 24 January 1955, Commander H. Marvin-Smith in command.

Gallery

See also
 Army on the Frontier
 Fort Snelling and the establishment of Minneapolis and Saint Paul
 Lawrence Taliaferro
 List of National Historic Landmarks in Minnesota
 List of the oldest buildings in Minnesota
 National Register of Historic Places listings in Hennepin County, Minnesota
 Slavery at Fort Snelling

References

Other sources

Further reading
 
 DeCarlo, Peter.  Fort Snelling at Bdote: A Brief History (Minnesota Historical Society Press, 2017). 96 pp.

External links
 
 Round Tower, Fort Snelling in MNopedia, the Minnesota Encyclopedia 
 Three Score Years and Ten – Life-Long Memories of Fort Snelling, Minnesota, and other parts of the West, by Charlotte Ouisconsin Van Cleve. Published in 1888, from Project Gutenberg
 Fort Snelling National Cemetery, Department of Veterans Affairs Official webpage
 Minneapolis VA Medical Center, Department of Veterans Affairs Official webpage
 Minneapolis-St. Paul International Airport Official website
 NHL summary
  – includes description and details on buildings
 Historic Fort Snelling page of the Mississippi National River and Recreation Area's website

1825 establishments in the United States
Articles containing video clips
Internment camps
Snelling
Snelling
Living museums in Minnesota
Military and war museums in Minnesota
Minnesota Historical Society
Minnesota in the American Civil War
Minnesota state historic sites
National Register of Historic Places in Mississippi National River and Recreation Area
Museums in Hennepin County, Minnesota
National Historic Landmarks in Minnesota
National Register of Historic Places in Minneapolis
Pre-statehood history of Minnesota
American Civil War on the National Register of Historic Places